The Ronga narrow gauge railway is located in Mari El, Russia.

Current status 

The Peat enterprise Ronga was established in 1960s in the village of Ronga, Mari El. The first line of Ronga peat narrow-gauge railway was constructed in 1967, within Sovetsky District from the village of Ronga. The peat railway was built for hauling milling peat and workers and operates year-round. In 2011, repairs are being made to the track.

Rolling stock

Locomotives 
 TU6A – № 3745
 TU8

Railway cars 
 Flatcar
 Open wagon for peat TSV6A

Work trains 
 TU6A with a snowplow LD-24
 Draisine – TD-5u "Pioneer"

See also
Narrow-gauge railways in Russia
List of Russian narrow-gauge railways rolling stock

References

External links

 «The site of the railroad» S. Bolashenko 

750 mm gauge railways in Russia
Railway lines opened in 1967
Rail transport in Mari El